The 2020 Israel Super Cup is the 25th Israel Super Cup (30th, including unofficial matches, as the competition wasn't played within the Israel Football Association in its first 5 editions, until 1969), an annual Israel football match played between the winners of the previous season's Top Division and Israel State Cup. This is the fifth time since 1990 that the match was staged after a planned resumption of the cup was canceled in 2014.

The games were played between Maccabi Tel Aviv, champions of the 2019–20 Israeli Premier League and Hapoel Be'er Sheva, winners of the 2019–20 Israeli State Cup.

Match details

First leg

Second leg

References

2020–21 in Israeli football
Super Cup 2020
Super Cup 2020
Israel Super Cup
Israel Super Cup
Israel Super Cup matches